Theodoros Christodoulou (Greek: Θεόδωρος Χριστοδούλου; born March 12, 1977) is a Cypriot alpine skier.

He represented his country at the 2002 and 2006 Winter Olympics.

References 

1977 births
Living people
Alpine skiers at the 2002 Winter Olympics
Alpine skiers at the 2006 Winter Olympics
Olympic alpine skiers of Cyprus
Cypriot male alpine skiers